The Institute of Democratic Society is a Chinese human rights advocacy non-profit started in 2009 by Lan Zhixue and other lawyers. It has been involved in activism relating to several prominent controversies involving speech, dissent, internet freedom, civil procedures, and government transparency.

References

Human rights organizations based in China
Non-profit organizations based in China